Curtis Jamall Brown (born September 24, 1988) is a former American football cornerback. He played collegiately at the University of Texas. He was selected in the third round of the 2011 NFL Draft by the Pittsburgh Steelers.

High School and Collegiate career
Brown played high school football at Gilmer, Texas, along with fellow high school stars Manuel Johnson, Justin Johnson, G. J. Kinne, and David Snow.  He starred at both CB and WR, winning a state championship in 2004 as a sophomore.  He was ranked as a 5-star prospect by most major recruiting sites, and chose to attend the University of Texas.

Brown finished his career at Texas with 105 tackles, 2 forced fumbles and 2 interceptions, both of which were returned for over 70 yards and resulted in one touchdown.  As a junior in 2009 Brown was an honorable mention All-American by Pro Football Weekly and the Associated Press.

Professional career

Pittsburgh Steelers
Brown was drafted by the Pittsburgh Steelers of the National Football League in the 3rd round, 95th overall in the 2011 NFL Draft. He was released by the Steelers on March 5, 2014, along with Levi Brown and Larry Foote.  The release came after Brown played in only seven games and recorded just seven tackles before tearing his ACL.

New York Jets
Brown was signed by the New York Jets on February 10, 2015. He was waived on August 30, 2015.

Personal
Brown's uncle, Hosea Taylor, played in the National Football League for the Baltimore Colts from 1981 to 1983.

References

External links
Texas Longhorns bio

1988 births
Living people
African-American players of American football
American football cornerbacks
Texas Longhorns football players
Pittsburgh Steelers players
New York Jets players
Players of American football from Texas
People from Longview, Texas
21st-century African-American sportspeople
20th-century African-American people